The Austrian Imperial Order of Leopold was founded by Franz I of Austria on 8 January 1808. The order's statutes stipulated only three grades: Grand Cross, Commander and Knight. During the war, in common with the other Austrian and later Austro-Hungarian decorations, crossed swords were instituted to reward bravery in the face of the enemy.

An Imperial Decree of 1 February 1901 ordered that in future, the senior grade would be split into two separate awards. From then onwards, there were four ranks: Grand Cross, First Class, Commander, Knight.

Until 18 July 1884, the award of the order also entitled the recipient, if he was not already of that standing, to be raised to the following appointments and/or ranks of the nobility:
Grand Cross: Privy Councillor
Commander:	Baron
Knight: Ritter

Insignia 
Both the Grand Cross and the First Class members of the Order wore (on formal occasions) their insignia in the form of a sash with the badge attached to the bow and respectively an eight-pointed and a four-pointed breast star. The Grand Cross was somewhat larger than the First Class, as was the width of the sash. A Commander's badge was worn at the neck, suspended from a 52 mm wide ribbon; a Knight wore his badge on a triangular ribbon on the left breast.

The badge consists of a red-enameled gold cross, with white enamel edging. The obverse of the badge displays the initials FIA in gold on a red enamel background. The mottoes of the Order were INTEGRITATI ET MERITO and OPES REGUM CORDA SUBDITORUM. The ribbon of the Order is red with two narrow white side-stripes. The badge's cross is surmounted by a golden imperial crown.

The Grand Cross could also be awarded with diamonds; from 1808 to 1918, only four people received this honour. The last recipient, Ernst Graf von Silva-Tarouca, was awarded the decoration on 11 November 1918, hours before Charles I of Austria withdrew from public affairs. After 1918, the Order was no longer awarded.

Famous recipients 

Karl Samuel Grünhut
Korvettenkapitän Georg Ludwig von Trapp. Father of the famous Von Trapp family that inspired the movie The Sound of Music. He was awarded the order for sinking 13 ships as a submarine commander in the Adriatic Sea during World War I.

See also 
 Nobility
 Order of chivalry
 Order of St. George (Habsburg-Lorraine)
 Order of the Iron Crown
 Orders, decorations, and medals of Austria-Hungary

References

Bibliography 
 Gustav Adolph Ackermann, Ordensbuch, Sämtlicher in Europa blühender und erloschener Orden und Ehrenzeichen. Annaberg, 1855
 Václav Měřička, Orden und Ehrenzeichen der Österreichisch-Ungarischen Monarchie, Wien 1974

External links 
Ordre Impérial Autrichien de Léopold
Císařský rakouský řád Leopolda (1808)
The Imperial Austrian Order of Leopold 1914–1918

Orders of chivalry of Austria
Orders, decorations, and medals of Austria-Hungary
1808 establishments in Austria
 4
Awards established in 1808